Hagiga B'Snuker (lit. Party at the Snooker; originally simply Snooker) is a 1975 Israeli cult film, one of the classic Bourekas films. The movie was directed by Boaz Davidson and stars Israeli comedians Ze'ev Revach, Yehuda Barkan and Yosef Shiloah.

Cast 
Yehuda Barkan – Gavriel (Gavri) Levi/Azriel Levi
Ze'ev Revach – Hannukah	
Yosef Shiloach – Salvador
Nitza Shaul – Yona
Tuvia Tzafir – Mushon
Yaakov Banai – Rabbi Yosef Shemesh
Arieh Elias – Halfon
 – The contractor
Talia Shapira – Riki
Music by Matti Caspi

Plot 

The story is about two twin brothers, Azriel and Gavriel (both played by Yehuda Barkan). Azriel is a shy and religious Jew who works in a fruit shop in Jaffa. Gavriel is a hoodlum and hustler who runs a snooker bar. Gavriel and his friend Hanuka make easy money by swindling innocent people into gambling on snooker games. One day Gavriel is forced to renew contact with his brother, because he is in trouble with a gangster who won the bet on a snooker game, and the only way to pay is by selling the family estate which is co-owned by the two brothers.

See also 
Charlie Ve'hetzi

External links 
 "Hagiga BaSnuker" - The full film is available on VOD on the website for the Israel Film Archive - Jerusalem Cinematheque
 
  Festival at the Poolroom (Hagiga B'Snuker )1975 DVD-Israeli movie

1975 films
1975 comedy films
Films directed by Boaz Davidson
1970s Hebrew-language films
Israeli comedy films
Snooker films